The nature of the activities of advocacy groups is highly dependent on the scope and extent on group aims and objectives. Motives for advocacy group action may be based on a shared political, religious, moral, health or commercial position. Groups use varied methods to try to achieve their aims including lobbying, media campaigns, publicity stunts, polls, research, and policy briefings. Some groups are supported or backed by powerful business or political interests and exert considerable influence on the political process, while others have few or no such resources.

Letter-writing, petitions and marches
Traditionally, the campaigns of pressure groups have included things such as letter-writing, petitions and marches. For example, in the mid-1980s, LIFE compiled a petition of more than 2,000,000 names opposed to abortion, organised a "Mail MPs a Mountain" campaign in 1987 and employed postcard campaigns in 1989 and 1990 against the Human Fertilisation and Embryology Act 1990.

Marches and demonstrations organised by the Anti-Poll Tax Federation in 1990 were said to have contributed to Margaret Thatcher's resignation as Prime Minister in November that year, and led to the subsequent replacement of the 1989 Community Charge (poll tax) with council tax in 1993. In February 2003, millions took to the streets as part of the Stop the War Coalition's efforts to persuade the government not to deploy US forces in Iraq.

In countries such as the United States, petition-signing and letter-writing have been used to good effect at pride marches. These have been influential in the repeal of sodomy laws, support for civil unions and same-sex marriage, and on supporting anti-discrimination legislation. For example, in the 1998 Asbury Park pride march, the New Jersey Lesbian and Gay Coalition distributed postcards to Christine Todd Whitman and to two members of the state assembly asking them to oppose a state version of the Defense of Marriage Act. The Philadelphia Lesbian and Gay Task Force also distributed an "Update Call to Action", urging people to make telephone calls to state officials and write letters in support of education reform, revising state education policies and encouraging lawmakers to add sexual orientation and gender identity as protected rights under the Pennsylvania Civil Rights Initiative.

Following concerns over a proposed ban on hunting with dogs and lack of concern for rural issues, in 2002 the Countryside Alliance organised "the march for Liberty and Livelihood", which allegedly attracted over 400,000 people (including the Conservative Party leader Iain Duncan Smith) and attracted supporters from New Zealand, Australia, Canada, the United States and across Europe.

Directly influencing the legislative process
In most liberal democracies, advocacy groups tend to use the bureaucracy as the main channel of influence – because, in liberal democracies, this is where the decision-making power lies. The aim of advocacy groups here is to attempt to influence a member of the legislature to support their cause by voting a certain way in the legislature. Access to this channel is generally restricted to groups with insider status such as large corporations and trade unions – groups with outsider status are unlikely to be able to meet with ministers or other members of the bureaucracy to discuss policy. What must be understood about groups exerting influence in the bureaucracy is; "the crucial relationship here [in the bureaucracy] is usually that between the senior bureaucrats and leading business or industrial interests". This supports the view that groups with greater financial resources at their disposal will generally be better able to influence the decision-making process of government. The advantages that large businesses have is mainly due to the fact that they are key producers within their countries economy and, therefore, their interests are important to the government as their contributions are important to the economy. According to George Monbiot, the influence of big business has been strengthened by "the greater ease with which corporations can relocate production and investment in a global economy".  This suggests that in the ever modernising world, big business has an increasing role in influencing the bureaucracy and in turn, the decision-making process of government.

Core insider groups have the ability to directly influence the formation of government policy at its primary sage through direct consultation with ministers, the civil service and government-appointed bodies working on these legislative proposals. Beyond these core insiders, specialist insider groups may also be called in to give specific information on a particular issue when it is necessary that their point of views or specialist interest is represented in discussions with ministers, the civil service or the government of the day.

This consultation may involve informal discussions with relevant departments, or be more structured around a Green Paper Many larger groups employ lobbyists to pursue their legislative goals, and of those the richest groups maintain permanent Westminster offices. In the modern era, it has become more common for groups to employ lobbyists who will use their contacts on behalf of the pressure group in question in exchange for a fee; however, groups whose aims are local and limited in scale may be able to achieve their goals without needing to lobby, in contrast to broader-based groups.

In the British cash-for-questions affair, which began when The Guardian newspaper alleged that London's most successful parliamentary lobbyist, Ian Greer of Ian Greer Associates, had bribed two Conservative Members of Parliament in exchange for asking parliamentary questions, and other tasks, on behalf of the Egyptian owner of Harrods department store, Mohamed Al-Fayed. The controversy prompted John Major to instigate the Nolan Committee, to review the issue of standards in public life.

Lobbying in the US and in the UK is regulated to stop the worst abuses which can develop into corruption. In the United States the Internal Revenue Service makes a clear distinction between lobbying and advocacy.

Influencing political parties
Advocacy groups can cultivate links with political parties in order to influence policy decisions. This is better done when the party is a party of opposition, as a party in government it will he hindered by time constraints, and policy formation is likely to be "top-down", not "bottom-up". However, when a party is in opposition, it will be more accepting towards a variety of ideas in order to broaden its support and formulate new policies. During Labour's time in opposition, groups such as Charter 88 and the Electoral Reform Society attempted to cultivate links with the party between 1979 and 1997.

Another way groups can cultivate links with political parties is through campaign finance. For instance; in the UK, as the Conservative Party's campaigns are often funded by large corporations, it has been argued that many of its campaigns reflect the interests of businesses. In the United States, George W. Bush's re-election campaign in 2004 was the most expensive in American history and was financed mainly by large corporations and industrial interests that the Bush administration represented in government. Conversely, left-wing parties are often funded by organised labour – when the British Labour Party was formed, it was largely funded by trade unions. Often, political parties are actually formed as a result of group pressure, for example, the Labour Party in the UK was formed out of the new trade-union movement which lobbied for the rights of workers.

Embarking on legal action
The judicial branch of government can also be used by advocacy groups to exert influence, especially in states that have codified constitutions, such as the United States. For example, the National Association for the Advancement of Colored People (NAACP) lobbied against the Topeka Board of Education in 1954 (Brown v. Board of Education), arguing that segregation of education based on race was unconstitutional. As a result of group pressure from the NAACP, the supreme court unanimously ruled that racial segregation in education was indeed unconstitutional and such practices were banned. This is a novel example of how advocacy groups can exert influence in the judicial branch of government.

Although British courts do not have the same powers of judicial review as the US Supreme Court, litigation has been deemed a successful tactic for British pressure groups. Such action generally works on four levels:
 Where a court finds that a government has acted ultra vires;
 Where the rules in place violate EU law or the European Convention on Human Rights;
 Where an Act of Parliament or action of a public official violates the Human Rights Act 1998;
 Where litigation raises public awareness of an issue, irrespective of the outcome of the case. For example, the Pro-Life Alliance attempted to use the Human Rights Act to prevent the separation of conjoined twins Jodie and Mary, where it became clear that Mary would die as a result of the procedure, in order to highlight loopholes in the Human Fertilisation and Embryology Act 1990.

Direct action campaigns
Use of direct action is increasingly popular among pressure groups. The premise of direct group action stems from the concept that traditional methods of influencing government policy are flawed, and that more direct protests, acts of civil disobedience and (in more extreme cases) illegal acts and violence may offer the best opportunity of group success, as they captivate media attention.

In the 1970s and 1980s, direct action was often used by gay liberation movements; for example, the Gay Activists Alliance in the United States often used "zaps" to gain their objectives.

References

Advocacy groups
Political terminology
Public choice theory